Roscoe Presbyterian Church and Westfield Flats Cemetery is a historic Presbyterian church and cemetery on Old NY 17 in Roscoe, Sullivan County, New York.  The church was built about 1884 and is a simple rectangular wood-frame building, three bays wide and three bays deep, with a large rear cross-gabled wing.  It features a narrow, engaged, center entrance tower surmounted by a spire. The cemetery contains about 200 burials, with the earliest dating to the first decade of the 19th century.

The church was spared during the 1916 downtown fire which destroyed 23 buildings.
It was added to the National Register of Historic Places in 2001.

References

External links
 

Presbyterian churches in New York (state)
Churches on the National Register of Historic Places in New York (state)
Protestant Reformed cemeteries
Cemeteries on the National Register of Historic Places in New York (state)
Churches in Sullivan County, New York
Cemeteries in Sullivan County, New York
National Register of Historic Places in Sullivan County, New York